Dichagyris melanuroides is a moth of the family Noctuidae. It is widespread in the Near East and Middle East, from Kirghizia, Uzbekistan, Tajikistan to Afghanistan, north Pakistan, north India and Iran.

Adults are on wing in July. There is one generation per year.

External links
 Noctuinae of Israel

melanuroides
Moths of the Middle East
Moths described in 1930